The Arroyo Penasco Group is a group of geological formations exposed in the Nacimiento, Jemez, Sandia, and Sangre de Cristo Mountains of northern New Mexico. It preserves fossils characteristic of the late Mississippian.

Description
The Arroyo Penasco Group consists of marine sedimentary formations, primarily massive limestone but with some sandstone. It is divided into the lower Espiritu Santo Formation and the upper Tererro Formation.

The lowermost part of the Espiritu Santo Formation is designated the Del Padre Member and is a transgressive siltstone, sandstone, and shale unit, which interfingers with the carbonate rocks of the upper Espiritu Santo Formation, recording the advance of the sea into the area. A similar sequence is seen in the Tererro Formation, whose base is a collapse breccia.

The group rests everywhere on Precambrian basement that shows remarkably little relief, suggesting that the group was deposited on a peneplain. Its outcrops are spotty and its upper contact shows indications of well-developed karst topography, often filled in by the iron-rich sediments of the Log Springs Formation, indicating that it was heavily eroded before deposition of the Sandia Formation.

The Espiritu Santo Formation has undergone dolomitization, dedolomitization, and calcitization of gypsum and the Macho Member (the lowest part of the Tererro Formation) has experienced dissolution and brecciation. Together with the presence of paleosilcretes in the Manuelitas Member, the middle part of the Tererro Formation, this suggests a history of at least four episodes of sea level fluctuation during the Mississippian in northern New Mexico. Diagenetic fabrics can be traced across the region, demonstrating that the group was deposited across an extensive surface of low relief.

Fossils
The fossil assemblage suggests an age of Osagean to Meramecian.

History of investigation
The massive limestone beds of the Arroyo Penasco Group were originally included as the base of the Pennsylvanian Sandia Formation. The discovery of Endothyra and Plectogyra in 1951 showed that the beds were actually Mississippian in age, and they were split off as the Arroyo Penasco Formation. The Arroyo Penasco was later found to correlate to the Espiritu Santo Formation and Tererro Formation in the Sangre de Cristo Mountains, and it was promoted to group rank.

See also

 List of fossiliferous stratigraphic units in New Mexico
 Paleontology in New Mexico

Footnotes

References
 
 
 
 

Carboniferous formations of New Mexico
Carboniferous southern paleotropical deposits
Geologic groups of New Mexico
Limestone formations of the United States